The 2022 Cary Challenger was a professional tennis tournament being played on hard courts. It was the 9th edition of the tournament which was part of the 2022 ATP Challenger Tour. It took place in Cary, North Carolina, United States between 12 and 18 September 2022.

Singles main-draw entrants

Seeds

 1 Rankings are as of August 29, 2022.

Other entrants
The following players received wildcards into the singles main draw:
  Martin Damm
  Ryan Seggerman
  Braden Shick

The following players received entry into the singles main draw as alternates:
  Nick Chappell
  Tennys Sandgren

The following players received entry from the qualifying draw:
  Daniil Glinka
  Ryan Harrison
  Garrett Johns
  Cannon Kingsley
  Henry Patten
  Donald Young

Champions

Singles

  Michael Mmoh def.  Dominik Koepfer 7–5, 6–3.

Doubles

  Nathaniel Lammons /  Jackson Withrow def.  Treat Huey /  John-Patrick Smith 7–5, 2–6, [10–5].

References

2022 ATP Challenger Tour
2022
2022 in American tennis
September 2022 sports events in the United States